Joe Byrd was a vaudeville comedian. He was from Jacksonville, Florida.

The Indianapolis Freeman gave him plaudits in 1914 for his role with "Birdie" Byrd in the duo Byrd & Byrd. He and Billy Higgins starred in Black Sambo in 1925 and Midnight Steppers in 1927.

Shows
My Friend from Kentucky (1913/1914)
Let 'Em Have It (1923), co-starring with Billy Ewing
Aces and Queens
Lucky Sambo (1925) 
Ace High Revue (1927)Midnight Steppers (1927)Harlem Darlings (1929)Blackbirds of 1939 (1939)Harlem Cavalcade'' (1942)

References

Vaudeville performers
Year of birth missing
Year of death missing